Quah may refer to:
Tahlequah, Oklahoma, a city in Oklahoma
Issaquah, Washington, a city in Washington state
Quah (album), an album by Jorma Kaukonen
a Hokkien-language romanization of the Chinese surname Ke (surname), common in Southeast Asia